Goin' Ape! is an album by American comedian, comedy writer, and radio personality Jackie Martling.  The album was released in 1980 on the Off Hour Rockers label.

Track listing
Side I: "I Dreamt I Was Awake, and When I Woke, I Was Asleep"
Side A: "A Safe Distance from Genius"

Background
In 1979, Martling issued his debut LP, What Did You Expect?  He released two more albums, 1980's Goin' Ape! and 1981's Normal People Are People You Don't Know That Well.  Martling sent all three records to fledgling New York City disk jockey Howard Stern. By 1986, he was a full-time member of Stern's show, later becoming the program's head writer. Martling maintained a steady schedule of live dates while working with Stern, recording Sgt. Pecker, Hot Dogs + Donuts, and The Very Best of Jackie Martling's Talking Joke Book Cassettes, Vol. 1.

Notes

 

1980 albums
Jackie Martling albums
1980s comedy albums
Self-released albums